Paula Forero Cabrera (born 25 January 1992) is a Colombian footballer who plays as a goalkeeper for American club PSE Conquistadores in the United Premier Soccer League Women's Division. She has been a member of the Colombia women's national team.

College career
Forero attended the University of Miami and the Barry University, both in the United States.

International career
Forero represented Colombia at the 2008 FIFA U-17 Women's World Cup and the 2010 FIFA U-20 Women's World Cup. At senior level, she was an unused goalkeeper at the 2014 Copa América Femenina. She made an appearance at the 2015 Pan American Games.

References

External links 
 

1992 births
Living people
Women's association football goalkeepers
Colombian women's footballers
Footballers from Bogotá
Colombia women's international footballers
Pan American Games competitors for Colombia
Footballers at the 2015 Pan American Games
Miami Hurricanes women's soccer players
Barry Buccaneers women's soccer players
Colombian expatriate women's footballers
Colombian expatriate sportspeople in the United States
Expatriate women's soccer players in the United States
Pan American Games silver medalists for Colombia
Medalists at the 2015 Pan American Games
Pan American Games medalists in football
21st-century Colombian women